Luigi Romanelli (29 November 1885, Belleville, Ontario - 29 July 1942, La Malbaie) was a Canadian conductor and violinist. His orchestra, the Romanelli Orchestra, was one of the most popular orchestras on radio, in concert, and on record in Canada from the 1920s up until his death in the early 1940s. Under his leadership, the Romanelli Orchestra made recordings for HMV, Edison Records, and Bluebird Records.

Romanelli and his orchestra performed on March 28, 1922, in the first concert broadcast on the radio in Toronto.

References

1885 births
1942 deaths
Male conductors (music)
Canadian classical violinists
Canadian male violinists and fiddlers
20th-century Canadian conductors (music)
20th-century Canadian violinists and fiddlers
20th-century Canadian male musicians